The Sambalic languages are a part of the Central Luzon language family spoken by the Sambals, an ethnolinguistic group on the western coastal areas of Central Luzon and the Zambales mountain ranges.

Demographics
The largest Sambalic languages are Sambal, Bolinao, and Botolan with approximately 200,000, 105,000 and 72,000 speakers, respectively, based on the 2007 population statistics from the National Statistical Coordination Board (NSCB). These figures are the combined population of the municipalities where the language is spoken.

For the Sambali or Sambal ethnolinguistic subgrouping, the estimated number of speakers is based on the total population of Santa Cruz, Candelaria, Masinloc, Palauig, and Iba municipalities of Zambales. For the Sambal Bolinao subgrouping, a projected number of speakers is taken from the combined populations of Anda and Bolinao municipalities of Pangasinan. The Sambal Botolan subgroup, on the other hand, takes the aggregated population of Botolan and Cabangan municipalities. The rest are smaller languages spoken almost exclusively within various Aeta communities. In total, there are approximately 390,000 speakers of Sambalic languages. Speakers can also be found in other towns of Zambales not mentioned above: Olongapo City, Bataan, Tarlac, and Metro Manila.

An estimated 6000 speakers can also be found in Panitian, Quezon, Palawan and Puerto Princesa City. The language is also spoken by many Filipino immigrants in the U.S. and Canada.

Internal classification
Roger Stone (2008) classifies the Sambalic languages as follows.
Ayta Abellen, Botolan Sambal
Tina Sambal, Bolinao
Ayta Mag-indi, Ayta Mag-antsi
Ayta Ambala

Ayta Magbukun was not included in Stone's (2008) classification.

External relationships
The Sambalic languages are most closely related to Kapampangan and to an archaic form of Tagalog still spoken in Tanay in the province of Rizal. This has been interpreted to mean that Sambal-speakers had once inhabited that area, later being displaced by migrating Tagalog-speakers, pushing the original inhabitants northward to what is now the province of Zambales, in turn, displacing the Aetas. There is also a possible relationship between these Sambalic language speakers and the population of the island provinces of Marinduque and Romblon based on commonalities in some traditions and practices.

Speakers
Sambal (Spanish: Zambal) is the common collective name for all Sambalic-language speakers. It is also the term referring to the Sambalic language subgrouping in northern municipalities of Zambales, which comprises the majority of Sambals or more than 50 percent (200,000) of all Sambalic languages speakers (390,000). Sambal may also refer to the inhabitants of Zambales as a whole and the residents of Bolinao and Anda in Pangasinan.

Sample text
Below are translations in Bolinao, Botolan, and Sambal of the Philippine national proverb "He/She who does not acknowledge his/her beginnings will not reach his/her destination", along with the original in Tagalog.

See also
Languages of the Philippines
Sambal people

References

Citations

Bibliography

External links

 
Central Luzon languages